Brothers of the Cross of Jesus were a French order of Roman Catholic monks. It was founded in 1820 at Lyons, France, by Father C.M. Bochard, Doctor of the Sorbonne, Vicar-General of the Diocese of Lyons. Bochard was the first superior general (1820–34). It grew during the 19th century in eastern France and in Switzerland, until the persecution of 1903, which destroyed nearly all its establishments. Brother Evariste with 32 religious were sent to establish a province in Canada under the patronage of André-Albert Blais, Bishop of Rimouski, in 1905.

References

1820 establishments in France
Catholic religious institutes established in the 19th century
Catholic orders and societies
Catholic Church in France